Baron Henri Eduard Joseph de Lannoy (3 December 1787 – 28 March 1853), was a Flemish composer, teacher, conductor, and writer on music who spent most of his life in Austria. His compositions bridge the classical and early romantic styles. His full name and title in German was 'Heinrich Eduard Josef, Freiherr von Lannoy'.

Biography
Political background

The turbulent political events from 1789 include the Belgian Revolution and the French Revolution; during the subsequent French Revolutionary Wars, French troops under Napoléon Bonaparte pushed the armies of the First Coalition as far as the Rhine, and in 1795 the Republic of France formally annexed the Southern Netherlands (now Belgium. See Map of Europe in 1812.) A number of government officials left the country, including Lannoy's father and Jean Vesque de Puttelange; they both eventually obtained official government positions in Vienna, where their sons had fruitful musical careers.

Early life
Eduard de Lannoy was born in Brussels, then in the Duchy of Brabant, a region of the Austrian Netherlands, part of the Holy Roman Empire. His father was Pierre Joseph Albert, baron de Lannoy (1733–1825), of the Lannoy family, one of the oldest families in Belgium. His father's career began in 1756 in the Finance department of the Austro-Belgian government; after the suppression of the Jesuit order in 1773 he was chief administrator for the disbursement of its estates. He received the Knight's Cross of the Order of St. Stephen and was made a Freiherr (Baron) in 1809. He died in Wildhaus (see below), 8 February 1825.

Lannoy, aged about 8, came with his parents to the Austrian Duchy of Styria in 1796. He attended school and the 'Gymnasium' in Graz from 1796 to 1801. A shared prize-winning cantata of his was performed in 1806.

Later life

Lannoy returned to Graz and continued his studies until May 1809. Lannoy spent several years alternating between Vienna and the castle which his father had purchased in 1808, Schloß Wildhaus (now Castle Viltuš), between Selnica ob Dravi and Marburg on the Drau (now Maribor, Slovenia). where he dedicated his life to music and poetry. In Graz he was a writer in the circle of Ignaz Kollmann, artist and editor of Aufmerksamen ('Observations').

He worked meritoriously and disproportionally in the service of music, less as a composer than to uplift and awake music's meaning and power. He became a member of the Gesellschaft der Musikfreunde, involving himself with oratorios and mixed concerts. Vincenz Houška conducted many of them, with Lannoy conducting in 1824–1825. Lannoy conducted the Concerts Spirituels founded by Franz X. Gebauer in 1820. After Gebauer died in 1822 aged 37, Lannoy, along with Carl Holz and Ludwig Titze continued to present the concerts. Lannoy's own music collection shows that a wide variety of contemporary music was played at these concerts.

Lannoy gave composition lessons to Johann Vesque von Püttlingen, who went on to write 300 songs under the pseudonym 'J. Hoven' (after Beethoven). The pianist child prodigy Leopoldine Blahetka had through-bass lessons with Lannoy. Lannoy was a contributor (number 22) to the fifty variations which Anton Diabelli commissioned from composers in the Austrian Empire in 1819: Beethoven responded with 33 of his own Diabelli Variations. Carl Czerny's Piano Sonata no. 11, Op. 730, was dedicated to Lannoy, as was Spohr's 5th Symphony (along with Carl Holz, Ludwig Titze and Ignaz Seyfried). Lannoy's collection of musical manuscripts included a set of 18th century parts for Mozart's Symphony no. 4, K. 181(162b).

Lannoy came into the circle of folkloric-educational endeavours centering on the unconventional Archduke John of Austria. Erzherzog Johann was best man at his wedding in Wildhaus. Lannoy was keen for folk music to be annotated and written down. In conversation and in writing, he disseminated the ideas of Jean-Jacques Rousseau in Vienna, especially the musical articles in the Aesthetic Lexicon by Ignaz Jeitteles which stem from his quill ("stammen aus Lannoy's Feder"). 

Lannoy was a powerful impulse for cultural and musical life in Graz and Vienna. He sat on the board of directors of the Gesellschaft der Musikfreunde, conducted its concerts. He sat on the board of the Vienna Conservatory, and was its director from 1830 until 1835.

He accompanied Adelaide Kemble ('Miß Adelheid Kemble') in a performance of Schubert songs for the new King and queen of Hanover in Karlsbad on 26 August 1837, following a concert earlier in August with Leopold Jansa.

Friends
His greatest reverence was reserved for Beethoven (see ), and he was on friendly terms with (alphabetically) Hector Berlioz, Alexandre Boucher, Carl Czerny, Félicien David, Gaetano Donizetti, Franz Lachner, Franz Liszt, Ignaz Moscheles, Ignaz Franz Mosel, Mozart's son Franz Xaver Wolfgang Mozart, Ignaz von Seyfried, Wenzel J Tomaschek, and Henri Vieuxtemps. He was closest to fellow clarinettist Count Ferdinando Troyer, the dedicatee of Franz Schubert's Octet in F major, D. 803. Another of his friends was Johann Vesque von Püttlingen, with whom he had composition lessons. Both came from Brussels, where their fathers had been government officials in the government of the Austrian Netherlands and were displaced by the French Revolution in 1795. 

He maintained a lively exchange of letters with Mendelssohn, Henri Vieuxtemps, the Swiss composer Franz Xaver Schnyder von Wartensee and Franz Lachner.

Works
His oeuvre runs to some 70 opus numbers.

Symphonies 
 Symphony in E major. Pemiered 1821 at a Gesellschaft concert (Symphony in E ("auf fünf Stimmen") published in Vienna by Haslinger)
 Symphony in C major. Premiered 1822 at 6th 'Concert spirituel' Reviewed in Allgemeine musikalische Zeitung, vol. 24, pp. 360–361 (in German), plus a list of works played in the Concerts Spirituels.
 Symphony no. 3 (in B?) According to Wolfgang Suppan, the four movements of his third symphony – which is based on the tale of Count Lara by Lord Byron – are unified as program music by a single characteristic theme, predating Berlioz' Symphonie fantastique of 1830 by several years.

Operas 
 Margarethe oder Die Räuber (1813/1814) (premiere in Graz, given in Vienna 1819)
 Olindo und Sophronia (1815)
 Rosa oder Die Einsiedeley in den Alpen (1816)
 Die Morlaken ('The Morlachs') (1817) Italian libretto by Gaetano Rossi, translated by Lannoy. (premiere Graz 1817)
 Libussa, Böhmens erste Königin (1818/1819) (premiere Brno)
 Die Europäer in Ostindien (1823)
 I due forzati (1825)
 Der Schreckenstein (1825)
 Des Liedes Macht (1826), unfinished
 Schloß Darville (1839), unfinished

Singspiels 
 Jery und Bätely (1816)
 Kätly (1827) (premiere 24 April Burgtheater Vienna)
 Zauberer Papagei und König Bär, Zaubererspiel (1830)

Melodramas 
 Ein Uhr, oder Der Zauberbund um Mitternacht (1822) Text by Wilhelm Vogel (1772–1843), from the English of Matthew ("Monk") Lewis.
 Der Mörder (1822)
 Carlos Romaldi (1822)
 Emmy Teels (1823)
 Die beiden Galeerensklaven (1823)
 Der Löwe von Florenz (1823)
 Abu, der schwarze Wundermann (1826) (produced in Vienna and Germany 1826–1830)

Other works 
Works with known Opus number
 Piano Sonata in A, Op. 6 (pub Mechetti)
 Erstes Rondo in C, Op. 7 (pub Haslinger)
 Grand Sonata in A minor, Op. 9
 Grand quintet in E, Op. 12, for oboe, clarinet, horn, bassoon and piano
 Grand Trio für Klavier, Klarinette und Cello, Op. 15
 Grosses Trio für Klavier, Violon und Violoncell, Op. 16. Vienna: S. A. Steiner (1820)
 Variations and Polonaise for Violin, Op. 17
 National-Tanz und Sangweisen des osterreichischen Kaiserstaats. Eine Sammlung charakteristischer Rondo's leichter Art, Book 1: Austria. Book 2: Styria, Opp. 30, 31
 Lieder, Op. 48
 Song, General Hentzi. Op. 68. Vienna: Mechetti
 6 easy Polonaises for piano, Op. 69
Without Opus number
 Overture and entractes for Castelli's play Tsar Ivan.
 3 sonatas for violin and piano
 Adagio and Polonaise for violin and piano (Bravura Variations?)
 Variations on a theme from Rossini's Zelmira for piano
Songs
 "Inno di Piero Maroncelli" (1838)
 Romance (words by La Fontaine) (1838)
 Romance (1838)
 "Lied der Schmetterlinge" (Song of the Butterflies) (words by Rückert) (1839)
 Two duets for mezzo-soprano and contralto, with piano (1840) 
 "An die Sterne" (To the Stars) (words by Rückert) (1841)
 "Schön bist du" (Rückert) (1842)
 "Zwölf Freier" (Rückert) ('Twelve suitors would I have') (1842)
 "Canzonetta veneziana" (1842)
 "Abendlied" (Rückert) (1844?)
 "Odalisque aux doux yeux" [Song, begins: "Livre aux vents du Bosphore"] (1845)

Poetry

Family
In 1819 he married Magdalena Katharina Josephine, daughter of Franz Xaver von Carneri. They had no children. They adopted a son, Rudolf Oskar Freiherr von Gödel-Lannoy (1814–1883):

In 1855 he was Consul-General of Syria & Palestine, in Beirut: Consul-General in Jassy, Moldavia, (now Iași, Romania), from October 1855 to 1862: Präsident der Central-Seebehörde Triest (Central Maritime Agency, Trieste) in 1868 and Ritter der L. Ordnungs. See also Exequatur and Schachbender – (Ottoman Consul)  He was on the board of directors of the K.K. priv. Südbahn-Gesellschaft in 1872 :de:Südbahn (Österreich) – Verwaltungsrath in Wien. "At the same time plans for a direct connection through the Alps were developed, promoted by Archduke John of Austria – [who knew Johann Vesque de Puttlingen) to open up the Styrian lands beyond Semmering Pass." (Southern Railway) He was a founder member of the Vienna Geographical Society from 1856. and a member of the Vienna Meteorological Society.

References
Notes

Citations

Sources

External links
 

1787 births
1853 deaths
Ed
Belgian male classical composers
Male composers
Belgian conductors (music)
Belgian male musicians
Male conductors (music)
Writers about music
19th-century Belgian male musicians